William Byrne (April 17, 1906 – January 11, 1997) was an American painter. His work was part of the painting event in the art competition at the 1932 Summer Olympics.

References

1906 births
1997 deaths
20th-century American painters
American male painters
Olympic competitors in art competitions
People from Butte, Montana
20th-century American male artists